Milán Májer (born 28 July 1999) is a Hungarian football player who plays for Kecskemét.

Career

Budapest Honvéd
On 31 March 2018, Májer played his first match for Budapest Honvéd in a 1-1 draw against Diósgyőr in the Hungarian League.

Zalaegerszeg
On 7 June 2022, Májer signed with Zalaegerszeg on a two-year contract with an optional third year.

Kecskemét
On 9 February 2023, Májer moved again and joined Kecskemét.

Club statistics

Updated to games played as of 15 May 2022.

References

External links
 
 

1999 births
Living people
Footballers from Budapest
Hungarian footballers
Hungary youth international footballers
Hungary under-21 international footballers
Association football wingers
Budapest Honvéd FC players
Gyirmót FC Győr players
Győri ETO FC players
Zalaegerszegi TE players
Kecskeméti TE players
Nemzeti Bajnokság I players
Nemzeti Bajnokság II players